was one of 23 escort destroyers of the Tachibana sub-class of the  built for the Imperial Japanese Navy during the final stages of World War II. Completed in March 1945, she struck a mine in June, but was only lightly damaged. The ship was used to repatriate Japanese personnel after the war until 1947. Mid-year the destroyer was turned over to the Soviet Union, renamed Volny and was commissioned that same year. She was renamed TsL-24 and converted into a target ship two years later; the ship was ordered to be scrapped in 1960.

Design and description
The Tachibana sub-class was a simplified version of the preceding  to make them even more suited for mass production. The ships had two Kampon geared steam turbines, each driving one propeller shaft, using steam provided by two Kampon water-tube boilers.

The main armament of the Tachibana sub-class consisted of three  Type 89 dual-purpose guns in one twin-gun mount aft and one single mount forward of the superstructure. The single mount was partially protected against spray by a gun shield. The accuracy of the Type 89 guns was severely reduced against aircraft because no high-angle gunnery director was fitted. The ships carried a total of 25 Type 96  anti-aircraft guns in 4 triple and 13 single mounts. The Tachibanas were equipped with Type 13 early-warning and Type 22 surface-search radars. The ships were also armed with a single rotating quadruple mount amidships for  torpedoes. They could deliver their 60 depth charges via two stern rails and two throwers.

Construction and service
 
Shii  was ordered in Fiscal Year 1944 under the Wartime Naval Armaments Supplement Program and she was laid down at Maizuru Naval Arsenal on 18 September 1944. The ship was launched on 13 January 1945 and completed on 13 March. Shii was assigned that day to Destroyer Squadron 11 under the Combined Fleet for working up, and was briefly attached to the Second Fleet on 1–20 April. On 5 June Shii struck a mine in the Bungo Strait and was lightly damaged, although two men were killed and eleven wounded. The ship was turned over to Allied forces at Kure at the time of the surrender of Japan on 2 September and was stricken from the navy list on 5 October. The destroyer was disarmed and used to repatriate Japanese personnel in 1945–1947. Shii was turned over to the Soviet Union on 5 July of the latter year.

She was commissioned two days later and assigned to the 5th Fleet. The ship was renamed Volny ( (Free)) on 22 July. The destroyer was placed in reserve on 14 February 1949 and was converted into a target ship on 17 June with the name of TsL-24. She was renamed as OT-4 on 18 November 1959 and was ordered to be scrapped on 8 August 1960.

Notes

Bibliography

 
 

Tachibana-class destroyers
Ships built by Maizuru Naval Arsenal
1945 ships
World War II destroyers of Japan
Destroyers of the Soviet Navy